Slavko Kremenšek (born 21 April 1931) is a Slovene historian and ethnologist.

In 1972 he won the Levstik Award for his book Slovensko študentovsko gibanje 1919–1941 (The Slovene Student Movement, 1919–1941).

References 

1931 births
Living people
20th-century Slovenian historians
Slovenian ethnologists
Levstik Award laureates